Dame Vivienne Myra Boyd  (née Lowe, 11 April 1926 – 13 July 2011) was a New Zealand woman active in community and public affairs.

Early life and family
Born Vivienne Myra Lowe in Lower Hutt on 11 April 1926, Boyd was the daughter of Winifred and Hugh Lowe. She was educated at Hutt Valley High School from 1940 to 1943, and then studied at Victoria University College, graduating Master of Science with third-class honours in 1948.

In 1948, she married Robert Macdonald Boyd, and the couple went on to have four children.

Community and public life
She was president of the National Council of Women (1978–1982), a member and later chair of the Consumer Council (1975–1988), and chair of the Abortion Supervisory Committee (1979–1980).

She had active lay leadership roles in the Epuni Baptist Church, and wider New Zealand Baptist roles as president of the Baptist Women’s League (1966–1968), as a member and later convenor of the Public Questions Committee (1967–1972, 1977–1979), as a member of the Baptist Union Council (1970–1985) and as president of the Baptist Union (1984–1985). She was the first woman to hold the latter two positions.

Honours
In 1977, Boyd was awarded the Queen Elizabeth II Silver Jubilee Medal. She was appointed a Commander of the Order of the British Empire in the 1983 New Year Honours, and then in the 1986 Queen's Birthday Honours, she was promoted to Dame Commander of the same order, for public and community services.

Death
Boyd died in Lower Hutt in 2011, and was buried in the Taita Old Cemetery. She had been predeceased by her husband, Robert, in 2004.

References

External links
Carey Baptist College bio

1926 births
2011 deaths
People from Lower Hutt
New Zealand Dames Commander of the Order of the British Empire
New Zealand Baptists
New Zealand public servants
People educated at Hutt Valley High School
Victoria University of Wellington alumni
20th-century Baptists